James Yates (born 1906 in Quitman, MS, died 1993 in New York, NY) was an African American anti-fascist who fought in the Spanish Civil War as a soldier in the Abraham Lincoln Brigade.

Before he volunteered to go to Spain to fight fascism in 1937, he lived first in Quitman, Mississippi, the son of sharecroppers. He went to Chicago at the age of 16 and found work as a meatpacker. He was active in the movement to protest the Scottsboro Case and became active in the Unemployed Councils organized by the Communist Party USA. He joined the Communist Party USA in 1936.

In Spain he met Langston Hughes and Ernest Hemingway. He served as an ammunitions and ambulance driver. He later wrote a memoir about his experiences in Spain, Mississippi to Madrid: Memoir of a Black American in the Abraham Lincoln Brigade.

During World War II he served in the US Army. According to his obituary in the New York Times he struggled to find work in the 1950s because of McCarthyism.

References 

Abraham Lincoln Brigade members
African-American communists
Members of the Communist Party USA
1906 births
1993 deaths
20th-century African-American people